= States and territories =

States and Territories may refer to:

- States and territories of Australia
- Provinces and territories of Canada
- States and union territories of India
- Political divisions of Mexico
- States and territories of the United States
